Step Brothers is a 2008 American comedy film directed by Adam McKay, produced by Jimmy Miller and Judd Apatow, and written by Will Ferrell and McKay from a story by Ferrell, McKay, and John C. Reilly. It follows Brennan (Ferrell) and Dale (Reilly), two grown men who are forced to live together as brothers after their single parents, with whom they still live, marry each other. Richard Jenkins, Mary Steenburgen, Adam Scott, and Kathryn Hahn also star.

The film was released by Sony Pictures Releasing on July 25, 2008, two years after Talladega Nights: The Ballad of Ricky Bobby. Both films feature the same main actors, as well as the same producing and writing team. It grossed $128.1 million and received mixed reviews.

Plot
39-year-old Brennan Huff and 40-year-old Dale Doback are immature adults still living at home. Brennan lives with his divorced mother, Nancy, and Dale lives with his widowed father, Robert. Robert and Nancy meet, fall in love, and marry, forcing Brennan and Dale to live together as step brothers. Brennan and Dale initially despise each other, and after Brennan defies Dale and touches Dale's drum set (once with his testicles), a violent brawl erupts between them. They are grounded with no television for a week and are ordered to find jobs within a month or be evicted.

When Brennan's arrogant classist younger brother Derek, a successful helicopter leasing agent, visits with his family, he openly ridicules Dale and Brennan, and Dale punches him in the face. Brennan is awed that Dale stood up to Derek, while Derek's discontented wife Alice finds Dale's courage attractive and begins a sexual affair with him. Brennan and Dale bond over their shared tastes and interests, particularly music. Robert, meanwhile, schedules several job interviews for them, but they perform poorly and then are bullied on their way home by school children. Robert and Nancy reveal that with Derek's help they plan to sell the house, retire and travel the world on Robert's sailboat. They also sign Brennan and Dale up for therapy and set up bank accounts for them to live off of until they find work. Brennan is attracted to his therapist, Denise, but the attraction is not mutual.

At Derek's birthday party, Dale and Brennan present a pitch video for their entertainment company, "Prestige Worldwide", that includes a music video, "Boats 'N Hoes", which they filmed on Robert's boat without his knowledge or permission. The presentation backfires when the video shows the boat crashing, shattering Robert and Nancy's sailing dreams and straining their marriage. On Christmas, Robert and Nancy announce they are getting divorced, upsetting Brennan and Dale, who blame each other. Brennan and Dale go their separate ways, live independently and gradually become functioning adults. 

Brennan gets a job at Derek's helicopter leasing firm and volunteers to oversee a prestigious event, the Catalina Wine Mixer. He hires the catering company that employs Dale and invites Robert and Nancy to attend. The party goes well until the lead singer of the hired Billy Joel cover band loses his temper with a heckler and is hustled away. Derek blames Brennan for the fiasco and fires him. Robert encourages Brennan and Dale to be their eccentric child-at-heart selves again and perform to save the party. The pair take the stage and Brennan sings "Por Ti Volaré" while Dale accompanies him on drums. Derek is so moved by Brennan's performance that he and Brennan make amends and Dale breaks off his relationship with Alice, to her dismay.

Six months later, Robert and Nancy are back together living in their old house, while Brennan and Dale have turned "Prestige Worldwide" into a successful entertainment company that owns various karaoke bars and clubs. Robert has turned his boat into a tree house and the therapist, Denise, confesses her attraction for Brennan. During the ending credits, Dale and Brennan exact their revenge on the school children who previously beat them up.

Cast

Release

Theatrical
Step Brothers was released in the United States on July 25, 2008.

Home media
The film was released for home video on December 2, 2008 in a single-disc rated edition, a single-disc unrated edition and a 2-disc unrated edition.  The film generated sales of an estimated 3.87 million units in DVD and Blu-ray, totaling $63.7 million.  For the home video release, Will Ferrell, John C. Reilly, and Adam McKay recorded a commentary track mostly in song, accompanied by Jon Brion; the track covers "the movie-making process [and] their characters' offscreen lives" in remarks that range "from the inspired to the irritatingly prolonged, but when Ferrell and Reilly really get into a good groove, they're actually funnier than the main feature". Step Brothers was released on 4K Blu-Ray on October 2, 2018.

Reception

Box office
Step Brothers opened in 3,094 theaters and grossed $30.9 million. It went on to gross $100,468,793 domestically and $27,638,849 internationally for a total of $128,107,642.

Critical reception
Step Brothers received mixed or average reviews from critics. On Rotten Tomatoes, the film has an approval rating of 55% based on 205 reviews, with an average rating of 5.60/10. The site's critical consensus reads, "Step Brothers indulges in a cheerfully relentless immaturity that will quickly turn off viewers unamused by Ferrell and Reilly -- and delight those who find their antics hilarious." On Metacritic, the film has a weighted average score of 51 out of 100, based on 33 critics, indicating "mixed or average reviews". Audiences surveyed by CinemaScore gave the film a grade "B" on scale of A to F.

Roger Ebert gave the film 1.5 out of 4 stars and stated, "When did comedies get so mean? Step Brothers has a premise that might have produced a good time at the movies, but when I left, I felt a little unclean".

Ty Burr in the Boston Globe wrote, "'Step Brothers' is crudely funny, which means that sometimes it's crudely hilarious and more often it's just crude." Variety critic John Anderson wrote, "the film is funny at times but lapses into the reflexive vulgarity that seems to be the default mechanism of the Apatow machinery." 

In the British Film Institute's 2012 Sight & Sound polls of the greatest movies ever made, The Snowtown Murders and Macbeth director Justin Kurzel named Step Brothers one of his 10 favorite films.

Cultural and political reception 
In the movie, Dale and Brennan make a video to pitch both Robert and Derek about investing in Prestige Worldwide, with a music video for a song titled "Boats 'N' Hoes". Since the release of the film, "Boats 'N' Hoes" has contributed to the success of the movie with over a million hits on YouTube and merchandise that references the song.

A political action committee (PAC) known as the "Boats 'N' Hoes PAC" was registered by Shaun Nowacki with the Texas Ethics Commission in 2014. Nowacki's firm was hired by multiple Republicans in Texas including 48th Texas Governor Greg Abbott, Dan Patrick (who was running for Lieutenant Governor), and Donna Campbell (who was campaigning for State Senator). The purpose of the PAC was never shared and was criticized by Lisa Paul, who served as the Texas Democratic Party Deputy Communications Director. Paul said, "Texas Republicans say they want to reach out to women, to be more inclusive, but actions like this reinforce a pattern of disrespect... Their contempt towards women is simply unforgivable."

The Catalina Wine Mixer event depicted in the film was not a real event that existed before or during the creation of the film. The event has since been created and hosted on Catalina Island on Descanso Beach.

Future

Cancelled rap album
McKay announced on Twitter in 2011 that production of a Step Brothers rap album featuring Ferrell and Reilly had begun, but later said that the rap album fell apart and will not be released.

Possible sequel
Ferrell and Reilly have talked about a sequel. Reilly had the idea. McKay was also interviewed about the possible sequel: He added that Ferrell and Reilly's characters would be mature and have jobs. "One of them's married and has a kid. They're still kind of goofballs but they've taken three or four steps. Then we have an idea for something happens that knocks him back to square one, and one of the brothers, John C. Reilly sort of instigates it, like 'we can't take this anymore.' And things go really bad, their lives kind of fall apart. They have to pull it back together is sort of the basic structure." McKay has also said that ideas that were not used in the first film may be used in the sequel.

McKay spoke to Empire in February 2014 and appeared to rule out a sequel to Anchorman 2 or Step Brothers saying, "No, that's the last sequel we're gonna do. There's nothing more fun to me than new characters and a new world. And now we're releasing this alt version, we're totally satisfied. No Anchorman 3."

In a 2014 interview with Collider, McKay indicated the door was still open for a Step Brothers sequel at some point, while making clear it wasn't a short term development priority, stating:

In February 2017, Ferrell said in an interview with Rolling Stone that there are currently no plans for a sequel to Step Brothers.

In November 2020, Reilly said in an interview on Conan of a sequel:

References

External links

 
 
 
 Scoring Session Photo Gallery at ScoringSessions.com

2008 films
2000s buddy comedy films
2000s screwball comedy films
American buddy comedy films
American screwball comedy films
Apatow Productions films
Columbia Pictures films
2000s English-language films
Films about dysfunctional families
Films about remarriage
Films directed by Adam McKay
Films produced by Judd Apatow
Films scored by Jon Brion
Gary Sanchez Productions films
Relativity Media films
Films with screenplays by Adam McKay
Films with screenplays by Will Ferrell
2008 comedy films
Films about brothers
2000s American films
Films set in Sacramento, California
English-language comedy films